This is a list of club owners in the Super League, the top league of professional rugby league clubs in Europe.

Super League

See also

 List of NRL club owners
 List of owners of English football clubs
 List of professional sports team owners

References

1.^  AAP. Telegraph Media Group Limited. 7 February 2018 https://www.telegraph.co.uk/tv/2018/02/07/millionaire-migrant-boss-review-apprentice-jobseekers-had-tough/. Retrieved 13 February 2018. Missing or empty |title= (help)

External links

Club owners
Rugby league-related lists
Rugby league chairmen and investors
Sports owners